The eleventh season of The Real Housewives of Atlanta, an American reality television series, is broadcast on Bravo. It aired on November 4, 2018, until April 21, 2019, and is primarily filmed in Atlanta, Georgia. Its executive producers are Steven Weinstock, Glenda Hersh, Lauren Eskelin, Lorraine Haughton-Lawson, Ken Martinez, Glenda Cox, Anne Swan, Anthony Sylvester, and Andy Cohen.

The Real Housewives of Atlanta focuses on the lives of Nene Leakes, Kandi Burruss, Cynthia Bailey,  Porsha Williams, Eva Marcille and Shamari DeVoe.

This season marked the final appearance of Shamari DeVoe.

Cast
Following the conclusion of the tenth season, Shereé Whitfield, Kenya Moore, and Kim Zolciak-Biermann left the show. For the eleventh season, NeNe Leakes, Kandi Burruss, Cynthia Bailey and Porsha Williams all returned to the series, with Eva Marcille being promoted to the main cast and singer of R&B girl group, Blaque, Shamari DeVoe joining the cast as a Housewife. 

Elsewhere, Marlo Hampton once again returned in a recurring capacity, while Tanya Sam was introduced as a "friend of the housewives" through her connection with Leakes and later Marcille. In addition to this, Yovanna Momplaisir is introduced as a guest this season through her connection with Leakes, with Shamea Morton also making guest appearances.

 During her appearance at the reunion, Hampton sits between Leakes and Burruss. Burruss and DeVoe each move down a seat so she can be seated.
 During her appearance at the reunion, Sam sits on the end of the left couch next to Marcille.

Episodes

References

External links

2018 American television seasons
2019 American television seasons
The Real Housewives of Atlanta
Atlanta (season 11)